Tasman is a settlement in the Tasman District of New Zealand's upper South Island.

The Tasman area covers a small peninsula on the southern and eastern side of the Moutere Inlet. It includes Kina Beach, a Tasman Bay / Te Tai-o-Aorere beach with rock pools which is only fully accessible during low tide.

The population of Tasman Village and Kina Beach is approximately 400. There is a general store, a medieval cafe, a vineyard, and a nine-hole golf course with views of Mt Arthur and Abel Tasman National Park. The area also has a cycling track, and is also a base from kayaking, fishing and hiking.

It was unveiled in October 2015, cost $60,000, and took local artists, community groups, Tasman District Council staff and volunteers six years to complete.

Country singer-songwriter Aly Cook and four-time adventure racing world champion Nathan Fa'avae were both raised in Tasman. A Harley Davidson motorbike group, Sons of Tasman, also originates from Tasman.

At the annual Muddy Buddy event, attendees in fancy dress get caked in mud from the inlet and are then cleaned off with fire hoses.

History

Tasman was originally named Aporo (the Māori word for apple), but was renamed in 1906 after Dutch explorer Abel Tasman.

The economy was originally based around orchards, but is increasingly based on arts, crafts, vineyards and tourism.

In March 2018, work began on a new 96-lot housing development south of the main village. Landowner Alan Trent, an American businessman, had originally proposed a development with 130 resident sections, 55 apartments, shops, a village plaza, open space, and lifestyle farmland. The plans were scaled back due to community opposition. Trent had put his nearby home on the market for $8.9 million in January 2016.

In December 2018, a local landowner sought planning approval for a small industrial development next to the village. Some residents opposed it, arguing it would affect the village's "rural charm".

Demographics

Tasman settlement

It had a population of 498 at the 2018 New Zealand census, an increase of 87 people (21.2%) since the 2013 census, and an increase of 153 people (44.3%) since the 2006 census. There were 186 households. There were 243 males and 249 females, giving a sex ratio of 0.98 males per female, with 105 people (21.1%) aged under 15 years, 48 (9.6%) aged 15 to 29, 261 (52.4%) aged 30 to 64, and 84 (16.9%) aged 65 or older.

Ethnicities were 93.4% European/Pākehā, 6.0% Māori, 0.6% Pacific peoples, 3.0% Asian, and 3.6% other ethnicities (totals add to more than 100% since people could identify with multiple ethnicities).

Although some people objected to giving their religion, 64.5% had no religion, 24.1% were Christian, 0.6% were Hindu, 0.6% were Buddhist and 1.8% had other religions.

Of those at least 15 years old, 108 (27.5%) people had a bachelor or higher degree, and 45 (11.5%) people had no formal qualifications. The employment status of those at least 15 was that 180 (45.8%) people were employed full-time, 84 (21.4%) were part-time, and 9 (2.3%) were unemployed.

Moutere Hills statistical area

Moutere Hills had a population of 3,177 at the 2018 New Zealand census, an increase of 564 people (21.6%) since the 2013 census, and an increase of 951 people (42.7%) since the 2006 census. There were 1,182 households. There were 1,596 males and 1,581 females, giving a sex ratio of 1.01 males per female. The median age was 48.6 years (compared with 37.4 years nationally), with 579 people (18.2%) aged under 15 years, 339 (10.7%) aged 15 to 29, 1,677 (52.8%) aged 30 to 64, and 585 (18.4%) aged 65 or older.

Ethnicities were 95.9% European/Pākehā, 5.4% Māori, 0.6% Pacific peoples, 1.7% Asian, and 1.9% other ethnicities (totals add to more than 100% since people could identify with multiple ethnicities).

The proportion of people born overseas was 24.2%, compared with 27.1% nationally.

Although some people objected to giving their religion, 60.3% had no religion, 27.8% were Christian, 0.2% were Hindu, 1.1% were Buddhist and 1.8% had other religions.

Of those at least 15 years old, 729 (28.1%) people had a bachelor or higher degree, and 303 (11.7%) people had no formal qualifications. The median income was $33,900, compared with $31,800 nationally. The employment status of those at least 15 was that 1,296 (49.9%) people were employed full-time, 522 (20.1%) were part-time, and 57 (2.2%) were unemployed.

Education

Every two years, the school holds a fundraising food and wine market called Taste Tasman.

References

Populated places in the Tasman District